Cold Justice: Sex Crimes is an unscripted procedural drama spin-off of Cold Justice that aired on TNT from July 31 to September 25, 2015.

In October 2014, TNT announced it greenlit a spin-off of Cold Justice. This new series features unsolved sex crimes and former Harris County, Texas, prosecutors Casey Garrett and Alicia O'Neill traveling the United States to help local law enforcement officers close dormant cases.

Episodes

Reception
Tom Conroy of Media Life Magazine says "The detective work may not exactly be Holmesian or Poirotian, but there's great satisfaction in watching the trap spring on the lead suspect". He summarizes "The premiere episode didn't leave us cold, but we're pretty sure the series can do better."

References

External links
 
 

2015 American television series debuts
2015 American television series endings
English-language television shows
TNT (American TV network) original programming
American television spin-offs
Television series by Magical Elves